The 2021–22 Providence Friars women's basketball team represent Providence College in the 2021–22 NCAA Division I women's basketball season. The Friars, led by sixth year head coach Jim Crowley, play their home games at Alumni Hall and are members of the Big East Conference.

Roster

Schedule

|-
!colspan=9 style=| Exhibition

|-
!colspan=9 style=| Non-conference regular season

|-
!colspan=9 style=| Big East regular season

|-
!colspan=9 style="|Big East tournament

See also
 2021–22 Providence Friars men's basketball team

References

Providence
Providence Friars women's basketball seasons
Provide
Provide